Belgrano Department may refer to:
Belgrano Department, San Luis
Belgrano Department, Santa Fe
Belgrano Department, Santiago del Estero

Department name disambiguation pages
pt:Belgrano (departamento)